Louise Tsi Chow is a professor of biochemistry and molecular genetics at the University of Alabama at Birmingham and a foreign associate with the National Academy of Sciences, known for her research on the human papillomavirus. Her research contributed to the discovery of gene splicing, and in 1993, her collaborator, Richard J. Roberts, received the Nobel Prize for the research, leading some to assert that Chow should have received the honor as well.

Biography
Chow was born in Hunan Province, Republic of China. Her father Chou Te-wei (周德偉) was a well known economist who worked in the Ministry of Finance of the Republic of China on Taiwan.

She studied agricultural chemistry at National Taiwan University, graduating in 1965 before moving to California to pursue graduate studies in chemistry at the California Institute of Technology, earning her Ph.D in 1973. She then undertook post-doctoral training at the University of California, San Francisco, researching the monkey tumor virus SV40.

She and her husband, fellow scientist Thomas Broker, joined Cold Spring Harbor Laboratory in 1975. It was here that, in the process of studying the genetic organization, DNA transcription, and RNA translation of adenoviruses, she and her colleagues discovered RNA splicing in 1977. This finding led to her collaborator, Richard Roberts, winning the 1993 Nobel Prize in Physiology or Medicine (shared with Phillip Sharp from MIT whose team independently made the discovery). Many feel that Chow deserved a share of the prize (see Nobel Prize controversy).

In 1984, she took a job with the University of Rochester School of Medicine, studying the genome of the human papillomavirus (HPV). Chow became a professor at the University of Alabama at Birmingham (UAB) in 1993, studying genetics and virology, focusing on diseases such as cancer, cystic fibrosis, and AIDS.

At UAB, Chow developed a method to produce large amounts of one of the most dominant cancer-causing HPV strains, HPV-18, in the laboratory, enabling her and her team to study HPV's entire replicative cycle.

Nobel Prize controversy
In 1993, her collaborator at Cold Spring Harbor Laboratory, Richard J. Roberts, was awarded the Nobel Prize, along with researcher Phillip Sharp, for the discovery of RNA splicing. Roberts called the award a "tribute" to his co-workers, including Chow. However, other scientists felt that Chow, who operated the electron microscope that allowed researchers to observe the splicing process, should have been included among the scientists awarded the Nobel Prize for the research. Chow told the Boston Globe that her contributions "were not trivial… it was a new type of experiment and needed to be designed and set up."

Key publications

Selected honors
Foreign Associate of the National Academy of Sciences, 2012
Member of Academia Sinica

References 

Women biochemists
Chemists from Hunan
National Taiwan University alumni
California Institute of Technology alumni
University of Alabama at Birmingham faculty
Chinese emigrants to the United States
Living people
Taiwanese people from Hunan
Taiwanese women scientists
Chinese women biologists
Chinese women chemists
Taiwanese biochemists
Members of Academia Sinica
Foreign associates of the National Academy of Sciences
Year of birth missing (living people)
Educators from Hunan
Biologists from Hunan
Fellows of the American Academy of Microbiology